Jawad Royen (born 16 May 1992) is a Bangladeshi cricketer from Jessore. 

Jawad Royen made his List A debut when he captained City Club in their inaugural List A match in the 2021–22 Dhaka Premier Division Cricket League on 15 March 2022, in which he was the side's top scorer with 37 not out. On 9 April he won the Player of the Match award when he scored 79 not out to take City Club to a three-wicket victory over Brothers Union off the final ball of the 50th over. He captained  City Club throughout their 2021-22 debut tournament; they finished tenth, enabling them to remain in the competition for the following season. He made his first-class debut on 26 October 2022, for Khulna Division in the 2022–23 National Cricket League.

References

External links
 

1992 births
Living people
Bangladeshi cricketers
Khulna Division cricketers
City Club cricketers
People from Jessore District